Meranoplus is an Old World genus of ants in the subfamily Myrmicinae. With over 80 valid species, it is predicted that over half of the Meranoplus diversity remains undescribed, most of these from Australia.

Classification
Meranoplus is a unique and charismatic myrmicine genus of hairy, slow-moving, and armored ants. The genus was previously classified in its own tribe, the Meranoplini, with one fossil genus, Parameranoplus, from Baltic amber (44.1 ± 1.1 mya), but was moved to Crematogastrini by Ward et al. (2015). The historic shuffling of Meranoplus through higher taxa — Cryptoceridae, Cataulacinae, Tetramoriini, Meranoplini — reflects our poor understanding of the phylogenetic position of Meranoplus within the Formicidae. Brady et al. (2006) recovered a clade of Meranoplus and Cataulacus, although this relationship was not supported in Moreau et al. (2006).

Distribution
The extant species of Meranoplus are distributed throughout the Old World, absent only from the Palearctic and Oceania regions but with the exception of M. levellei, from New Caledonia.

Biology
Species of this genus are predominantly ground-nesting and, when disturbed, will display thanatosis enhanced by crypsis, i.e., individuals will accumulate dirt in their pilosity and play dead. With respect to diet, most species are omnivores and facultative granivores, while others, including the whole M. diversus species group, are specialist granivores. At least one species, the Malaysian rainforest-dwelling M. mucronatus is known to have a trophobiotic relationship with hemipterans. Meranoplus species are known to be active both day and night, and to recruit via pheromone trails laid from the base of the sting using secretions from their extremely large Dufour glands. The function of the spatulate sting is still unknown. The only species of Meranoplus for which mating has been reported is M. peringuiyi, in which mating swarms occurred after a rain and where males patrolled for the outnumbered females in a zig-zag manner.

Species

Meranoplus affinis Baroni Urbani, 1971
Meranoplus ajax Forel, 1915
Meranoplus angustinodis Schödl, 2007
Meranoplus arcuatus Schödl, 2007
Meranoplus armatus Smith, 1862
Meranoplus astericus Donisthorpe, 1947
Meranoplus aureolus Crawley, 1921
Meranoplus barretti Santschi, 1928
Meranoplus beatoni Taylor, 2006
Meranoplus bellii Forel, 1902
Meranoplus berrimah Schödl, 2007
Meranoplus bicolor (Guérin-Méneville, 1844)
Meranoplus biliran Schödl, 1998
Meranoplus birmanus Schödl, 1999
Meranoplus boltoni Schödl, 1998
Meranoplus borneensis Schödl, 1998
Meranoplus castaneus Smith, 1857
Meranoplus christinae Schödl, 2007
Meranoplus clypeatus Bernard, 1953
Meranoplus convexius Schödl, 2007
Meranoplus crassispina Schödl, 2007
Meranoplus cryptomys Boudinot & Fisher, 2013
Meranoplus curvispina Forel, 1910
Meranoplus deserticola Schödl, 2007
Meranoplus dichrous Forel, 1907
Meranoplus digitatus Schödl, 2007
Meranoplus dimidiatus Smith, 1867
Meranoplus discalis Schödl, 2007
Meranoplus diversoides Schödl, 2007
Meranoplus diversus Smith, 1867
Meranoplus doddi Santschi, 1928
Meranoplus duyfkeni Forel, 1915
Meranoplus excavatus Clark, 1938
Meranoplus fenestratus Smith, 1867
Meranoplus ferrugineus Crawley, 1922
Meranoplus froggatti Forel, 1913
Meranoplus glaber Arnold, 1926
Meranoplus hilli Crawley, 1922
Meranoplus hirsutus Mayr, 1876
Meranoplus hoplites Taylor, 2006
Meranoplus hospes Forel, 1910
Meranoplus inermis Emery, 1895
Meranoplus laeviventris Emery, 1889
Meranoplus leveillei Emery, 1883
Meranoplus levis Donisthorpe, 1942
Meranoplus linae Santschi, 1928
Meranoplus loebli Schödl, 1998
Meranoplus magrettii André, 1884
Meranoplus malaysianus Schödl, 1998
Meranoplus mars Forel, 1902
Meranoplus mayri Forel, 1910
Meranoplus mcarthuri Schödl, 2007
Meranoplus minimus Crawley, 1922
Meranoplus minor Forel, 1902
Meranoplus mjobergi Forel, 1915
Meranoplus montanus Schödl, 1998
Meranoplus mucronatus Smith, 1857
Meranoplus naitsabes Schödl, 2007
Meranoplus nanus André, 1892
Meranoplus nepalensis Schödl, 1998
Meranoplus niger Donisthorpe, 1949
Meranoplus occidentalis Schödl, 2007
Meranoplus oceanicus Smith, 1862
Meranoplus orientalis Schödl, 2007
Meranoplus oxleyi Forel, 1915
Meranoplus parviumgulatus (Donisthorpe, 1947)
Meranoplus peringueyi Emery, 1886
Meranoplus pubescens (Smith, 1853)
Meranoplus puryi Forel, 1902
Meranoplus radamae Forel, 1891
Meranoplus raripilis Donisthorpe, 1938
Meranoplus rothneyi Forel, 1902
Meranoplus rugosus Crawley, 1922
Meranoplus sabronensis Donisthorpe, 1941
Meranoplus schoedli Taylor, 2006
Meranoplus similis Viehmeyer, 1922
Meranoplus snellingi Schödl, 2007
Meranoplus spininodis Arnold, 1917
Meranoplus spinosus Smith, 1859
Meranoplus sthenus Bolton, 1981
Meranoplus sylvarius Boudinot & Fisher, 2013
Meranoplus taurus Schödl, 2007
Meranoplus testudineus McAreavey, 1956
Meranoplus tricuspidatus Schödl, 2007
Meranoplus unicolor Forel, 1902
Meranoplus variabilis Schödl, 2007
Meranoplus vestigator Smith, 1876
Meranoplus wilsoni Schödl, 2007

References

External links

Myrmicinae
Ant genera